Gibbomesosella is a genus of longhorn beetles of the subfamily Lamiinae, containing the following species:

 Gibbomesosella laosica Breuning, 1969
 Gibbomesosella nodulosa (Pic, 1932)

References

Pteropliini